General McBride may refer to:

Allan C. McBride (1885–1944), U.S. Army brigadier general
Douglas M. McBride Jr. (born 1966), U.S. Army brigadier general
Horace L. McBride (1894–1962), U.S. Army lieutenant general
James H. McBride (1814–1864), Confederate Missouri Militia general in the American Civil War
William V. McBride (1922–2022), U.S. Air Force four-star general